St. Francis Xavier Cathedral is the cathedral church of the Roman Catholic Diocese of Green Bay in Green Bay, Wisconsin, United States. The cathedral was named in honor of St. Francis Xavier.

The cathedral was planned and erected between 1876 and 1881 under the episcopate of Francis Xavier Krautbauer. It was designed on the pattern of Ludwigskirche, a landmark church in the center of Munich, Germany. Krautbauer ordered a monumental crucifixion painted by Johann Schmitt, a local German-descent painter of the Nazarene movement. Krautbauer was buried under the cathedral's floor.

The cathedral began receiving a series of 18 restorations starting in 2014. It closed in September 2017 and was reopened at a 9:00 mass on Sunday December 3, 2017. 2017 Repairs include the floors, pews, paintings, and pipe organ.

Images

See also
List of Catholic cathedrals in the United States
List of cathedrals in the United States

References

External links

Official Cathedral Site
Roman Catholic Diocese of Green Bay Official Site

Religious organizations established in 1851
Roman Catholic churches completed in 1881
Churches in the Roman Catholic Diocese of Green Bay
Francis Xavier in Green Bay, Cathedral of
Buildings and structures in Green Bay, Wisconsin
Churches in Brown County, Wisconsin
1851 establishments in Wisconsin
19th-century Roman Catholic church buildings in the United States